Streptomyces yeochonensis is a bacterium species from the genus of Streptomyces which has been isolated from acidic soil in Korea.

See also 
 List of Streptomyces species

References

Further reading

External links
Type strain of Streptomyces yeochonensis at BacDive – the Bacterial Diversity Metadatabase

yeochonensis
Bacteria described in 2004